The Intellectual Property Office of the United Kingdom (often referred to as the UK IPO) is, since 2 April 2007, the operating name of The Patent Office. It is the official government body responsible for intellectual property rights in the UK and is an executive agency of the Department for Business, Energy and Industrial Strategy (BEIS).

Responsibilities 
The IPO has direct administrative responsibility for examining and issuing or rejecting patents, and maintaining registers of intellectual property including patents, designs and trade marks in the UK. As in most countries, there is no statutory register of copyright and the IPO does not conduct any direct administration in copyright matters.

The IPO is led by the Comptroller-General of Patents, Designs and Trade Marks, who is also Registrar of Trade Marks, Registrar of Designs and Chief Executive of the IPO. Since 13 December 2023, the Comptroller has been Adam Williams, Tim Moss was the previous Comptroller  following the resignation of John Alty who had been Comptroller-General since 2010. The Comptroller-General before Alty was Ian Fletcher, who had taken over after the retirement of Ron Marchant on 30 March 2007. The previous Comptroller-General was Alison Brimelow (who was afterwards President of the European Patent Office).

Substantive duties 
The existence of the Patent Office and the post of Comptroller-General are required by the Patents and Designs Act 1907 (though most of the remainder of this Act has been repealed), but the substantive duties of the IPO are set out in other legislation, including:

 The Registered Designs Act 1949
 The Patents Act 1977
 The Copyright, Designs and Patents Act 1988
 The Trade Marks Act 1994

Each of these Acts of Parliament has been extensively amended since it was first passed.

Manual of Patent Practice
The Manual of Patent Practice sets out the relevant patent law and the operational practice of the Intellectual Property Office in relation to patents.

History 

The forerunner of the Patent Office, the Office of the Commissioners for Patents, was established by the Patent Law Amendment Act 1852 and opened on 1 October that year. While this is claimed as the date the modern Intellectual Property Office was created it was in fact created later, along with the office of the comptroller under the Patents, Designs and Trade Marks Act 1883 (s 82).

There had been a Patent Bill Office, under the control of the Attorney General, which was part of the old patent system. It had been located in Lincoln's Inn.

Significantly, the process of applying for a patent was extremely complicated and largely set up to ensure fees were paid to various officials (patent fees formed a significant part of the stipend of the Attorney and Solicitor General). The Patent Law Amendment Act 1852 brought the process of patent grant into a single office serving the whole of the United Kingdom (where previously a petitioner had had to apply and pay fees to several offices, and to obtain separate patents for each of the UK's constituent nations).

Initially, people applying for a patent often used to submit a detailed model of their submission; these were retained and the collection became known as the Patent Museum (opened to the public in 1863 in South Kensington, it went on to become a core collection of the new Science Museum there).

Location 
From its early days, the Patent Office was based in the Chancery Lane area of London, where it eventually spread to fill the area between Furnival Street and Southampton Buildings. The principal entrance was at 25 Southampton Buildings, where a purpose-built headquarters was constructed in 1899–1902 (architect: Sir John Taylor). The principal interior space was the Library, a "harsh but spectacular space 140ft long, lit from skylights and a clerestory, with two tiers of steel-framed, fireproofed galleries on cast iron Corinthian columns". Designed to allow members of the public to consult patent records, it also contained a very extensive collection of technical and scientific publications, which in 1967 was transferred to the British Library.

In 1991, having outgrown its original premises, the Patent Office moved to Newport, South East Wales, where the IPO headquarters remains to this day. A small branch office in London has been maintained for the benefit of the large professional community based there and for communication with central government.

See also 
Copyright law of the United Kingdom
 Departments of the United Kingdom Government
 Chartered Institute of Patent Attorneys (CIPA)
 Institute of Trade Mark Attorneys (ITMA)
 Intellectual Property Regulation Board (IPReg)
 IP Federation (formerly the "Trade Marks, Patents and Designs Federation" or TMPDF)
 Patents County Court (PCC)
 Patent office
 Software patents under United Kingdom patent law
 Company Names Tribunal
 Police Intellectual Property Crime Unit (PIPCU) – Funded by the Intellectual Property Office

References

External links 
 
UK Patents Act 1977 and Rules

Department for Business, Energy and Industrial Strategy
Executive agencies of the United Kingdom government
Trading funds of the United Kingdom government
Intellectual Property Office, UK
Patent offices
Science and technology in the United Kingdom
Intellectual Property Office, UK
Intellectual Property Office, UK
Intellectual property organizations
Government-owned companies of the United Kingdom